The Gypsy Girl is a 1953 Yugoslav drama film directed by Vojislav Nanović and starring Raša Plaović, Elma Karlowa and Milivoje Živanović.

Cast
 Raša Plaović as Mitke
 Elma Karlowa as Kostana
 Milivoje Živanović as Hadži Toma
 Rastislav Jović as Stojan ... sin Hadži Tome
 Branko Đorđević as Arsa ... Predsednik opštine
 Bata Paskaljević 
 Jovan Nikolić
 Aleksandar Stojković as Kosta
 Nada Škrinjar 
 Divna Kostić as Salce ... Kostanina majka
 Mirko Milisavljević as Marko
 Pavle Vuisić as Guta
 Sima Janićijević as Kafedžija
 Janez Vrhovec as Bledi mladić
 Vladimir Medar 
 Stanko Buhanac as Pisar u opštini
 Ljupka Višnjić

References

Bibliography 
 Cornis-Pope, Marcel & Neubauer, John. History of the Literary Cultures of East-Central Europe: Junctures and Disjunctures in the 19th and 20th Centuries: Types and Stereotypes. John Benjamins Publishing Company, 2010.

External links 
 

1953 films
1953 drama films
Yugoslav drama films
Serbo-Croatian-language films
Films directed by Vojislav Nanovic
Films set in Yugoslavia
Yugoslav black-and-white films